Mphatlalatsane FC is a Lesotho football club based in Leribe. It is based in the city of Leribe in the Leribe District.

The team played in Lesotho Premier League until 2016.

Stadium
Currently the team plays at the 1,000 capacity St. Monica's Primary and Morate High School Stadium.

References

External links
Soccerway

Football clubs in Lesotho